Sardar is a 1994 Indian biographical drama film on Sardar Vallabhbhai Patel, one of India's greatest freedom fighters, directed by Ketan Mehta and written by noted playwright Vijay Tendulkar. The film was screened retrospective on 12 August 2016 at the Independence Day Film Festival jointly presented by the Indian Directorate of Film Festivals and Ministry of Defence, commemorating 70th Indian Independence Day.

Plot
The film begins with a young Sardar Patel playing cards with his friends and ridiculing Mahatma Gandhi and his policies to achieve independence. His views change however, when he is introduced to Gandhi by his brother, and upon listening to a lecture delivered by Gandhi, he joins him in his struggle. Sardar then successfully organises various Satyagrahas throughout Gujarat. The film then moves to the age of the Quit India Movement and India's freedom. Sardar is instrumental in convincing the working committee of the INC and Nehru to accept a proposal for the partition of India, when riots break out on the league's call for Direct Action. Sardar realises that not tackling the problem now might result in civil war in the country.
Once the partition has been accepted, Sardar then works to get all the princely states to join the Union of India, the film depicts his handling of the problems posed by the princely states of Kashmir, Junagadh and Hyderabad. The film also portrays his differences with Nehru and how they work together after the death of Gandhiji. The film ends with Sardar resting at the desert village of Shahpura in Rajasthan saying that today from Kashmir to Kanyakumari, there is one independent nation.

Cast

Paresh Rawal as Sardar Patel
Annu Kapoor as Mahatma Gandhi
Benjamin Gilani as Pt. Jawaharlal Nehru
Sri Vallabh Vyas as Mohammad Ali Jinnah 
Tom Alter as Viceroy Lord Mountbatten
H.M. Patel as himself
Lalit Tiwari
Ashish Vidyarthi as V. P. Menon
Govind Namdeo
Satish Kaushik
Suhasini Mulay
Raghuvir Yadav as Patel's servant
Vanya Joshi as Rajkumari Amrit Kaur
M. K. Raina
 Narendra Sachar as Khan Abdul Gaffar Khan

Soundtrack
The music of the film was composed by Vanraj Bhatia.

Awards
National Film Awards 1993

Best Film On National Integration
Best Editing – Renu Saluja

See also
 List of Asian historical drama films
 List of artistic depictions of Mahatma Gandhi

References

External links
 

1993 films
Cultural depictions of Vallabhbhai Patel
Cultural depictions of Mahatma Gandhi
Cultural depictions of Jawaharlal Nehru
Cultural depictions of Louis Mountbatten, 1st Earl Mountbatten of Burma
Films set in the Indian independence movement
Films directed by Ketan Mehta
Indian biographical films
Vallabhbhai Patel
1990s Hindi-language films
Biographical films about politicians
Films with screenplays by Vijay Tendulkar
Films whose editor won the Best Film Editing National Award
Films scored by Vanraj Bhatia
Best Film on National Integration National Film Award winners
Cultural depictions of Muhammad Ali Jinnah
1990s biographical films